Kentucky Route 146 (KY 146) is a  state highway in Kentucky that runs from U.S. Route 60 in the St. Matthews suburb of Louisville to U.S. Route 421, Kentucky Route 55, and Kentucky Route 573 in New Castle via Lyndon, Anchorage, Pewee Valley, Crestwood, Buckner, La Grange, and Pendleton. There are no low clearances along the entirety of the mostly two-lane route. The route is rather smartly designed as it carries traffic from Henry County to the east end of Louisville, KY. Interstate 71 exit 28 routes to KY 146 in Buckner.

The route is known as New La Grange Road to the west of its first rail crossing in Lyndon and as La Grange Road to the east (outside of city limits). Within the Anchorage city limits, the route is known as Ridge Road east of its westernmost rail crossing in Anchorage, and runs coterminously with Park Road to the west of that crossing. A portion of the route in Oldham County is referred to as the Oldham County Parkway. The route runs coterminously with Kentucky Route 393 for a  stretch in Buckner; it is known as Jefferson Street for approximately  within the city limits of La Grange, and as West Cross Main within the city limits of New Castle until its eastern terminus.

Controversy and planned improvements
Improvement of the route in Henry County has been a contentious topic since the early 2010s; lobbying efforts had been underway for years when the Kentucky Transportation Cabinet funded a $13.86 million improvement plan in 2016 to address the outsized frequency of car accidents on the route, which one local official claimed to be almost three times more likely to occur thereupon than on other main routes in Henry County. The route saw piecemeal improvement in the intervening years until April of 2020 when funding for the project was cut from the state budget by the Kentucky legislature.

Major junctions

See also

Roads in Louisville, Kentucky

References

0146
Kentucky Route 146
Kentucky Route 146